Terry Lathan is a former public school teacher and Alabama and American political activist. She served as Chairman of the Alabama Republican Party from February 2015 until she stepped down from the post on February 27, 2021.

Early life
She worked as a public school teacher in Mobile, Alabama. She served on the board of directors of the Boys and Girls Club of Greater South Alabama.

Political positions

LGBT rights
Lathan opposes same-sex marriage.

Abortion
Lathan supports government restrictions on abortion care. In 2013, she endorsed a bill which would have added more regulations and stumbling blocks to build women’s reproductive health clinics that provide abortion services.

Personal life
She is married to Jerry Lathan, the former Finance Chair of the Alabama Republican Party. They have a son and a daughter. They attend Christ United Methodist Church.

References

2012 United States presidential electors
21st-century American women politicians
21st-century American politicians
Alabama Republicans
Auburn University at Montgomery alumni
Living people
Politicians from Mobile, Alabama
State political party chairs of Alabama
Women in Alabama politics
Year of birth missing (living people)